{{DISPLAYTITLE:3-Deoxy-D-arabino-heptulosonic acid 7-phosphate}}

3-Deoxy--arabino-heptulosonic acid 7-phosphate (DAHP) is a 7-carbon ulonic acid. This compound is found in the shikimic acid biosynthesis pathway and is an intermediate in the production of aromatic amino acids.

Phosphoenolpyruvate and erythrose-4-phosphate react to form 3-deoxy--arabino-heptulosonate-7-phosphate (DAHP), in a reaction catalyzed by the enzyme DAHP synthase.

DAHP is then transformed to 3-dehydroquinate (DHQ), in a reaction catalyzed by DHQ synthase. Although this reaction requires nicotinamide adenine dinucleotide (NAD) as a cofactor, the enzymic mechanism regenerates it, resulting in the net use of no NAD.

The mechanism of ring closure is complex, but involves an aldol condensation at C-2 and C-7.

Metabolic engineering has improved production of DAHP by Escherichia coli. The first step, condensation of 3-deoxy--arabino-heptulosonic acid 7-phosphate (DAHP) from PEP/E4P, uses three isoenzymes AroF, AroG, and AroH. Each one of these has its synthesis regulated from tyrosine, phenylalanine, and tryptophan, respectively. These isoenzymes all have the ability to help regulate synthesis of DAHP by the method of feedback inhibition. This acts in the cell by monitoring the concentrations of each of the three aromatic amino acids. When there is too much of any one of them, that one will allosterically control the DAHP synthetase by “turning it off”. With the first step of the common pathway shut off, synthesis of the three amino acids can not proceed. The rest of the enzymes is in the common pathway (conversion of DAHP to chorismate).

References

External links
  

Carboxylic acids
Organophosphates
Heptoses
Monosaccharide derivatives